Grace Church is an Episcopal church at 193 Genesee Street in Utica, New York, which was established in 1838.

History
The establishing of Grace Church began in the spring of 1838 as an extension of the venerable Mother Parish of the city, Trinity Church. A group of twenty parish members wrote to their then Rector, the Rev. Pierre A. Proal, with the intention of organizing a new parish and requested his canonical consent. The first service was held on May 21, 1838 at 215 Genesee Street , in an upper room of a house located in the parish, and was accordingly organized under the name of Grace Church, Utica. The first church was constructed at the corner of Broadway and Columbia Streets in 1839, and the first service was conducted in the new building in August of that year. For the next 21 years this was the location of Grace Church. Its organist from 1923 to 1932 was Norman Coke-Jephcott.

The cornerstone of the church was set on July 10, 1856. Through the persistence and experience of Rev. John J. Brandegee, the church's third rector, he was able to procure enough funding to complete the construction and pay the mortgage. The first service was held in the new church on May 20, 1860, and by Easter Day, 1864, the $30,000 mortgage was finally paid.

The church had a long history for its mission to outreach to the neighboring community, but dwindling resources and a shrinking congregation brought the painful realization that the few remaining faithful could no longer hold the parish together. The last rector to serve there was the Rev. David Hopkins, who left in July, 1994. In little time, the vestry agreed to merge with Grace Church, and held the final service on November 20, 1994. The following week later on  November 27, 1994, the first Sunday of Advent, the people of Calvary Church were welcomed as members of the Grace Church congregation.
 
It was added to the National Register of Historic Places in 1997.

See also
 Forest Hill Cemetery (Utica, New York)

References

Sources
 
  and Accompanying 4 photos, exterior and interior, from January, 1997

External links
 Grace Church
 History of Grace Church

Churches in Oneida County, New York
Episcopal church buildings in New York (state)
Churches on the National Register of Historic Places in New York (state)
Churches completed in 1856
19th-century Episcopal church buildings
National Register of Historic Places in Oneida County, New York